Calcium borate (Ca3(BO3)2), also called Gerstley borate, is a bluish white crystal with a very defined structure. It can be prepared by reacting calcium metal with boric acid. The resulting precipitate is calcium borate. A hydrated form occurs naturally as the minerals colemanite, nobleite and priceite.

One of its uses is as a binder in some grades of hexagonal boron nitride for hot pressing. Other uses are e.g. flame retardant in epoxy molding compounds, a ceramic flux in some ceramic glazes, reactive self-sealing binders in hazardous waste management, additive for insect-resistant polystyrene, fertilizer, and production of boron glasses.

Also it used as a main source of boron oxide in the manufacturing of ceramic frits that used in the ceramic glaze or ceramic engobe for wall and floor ceramic tiles.

References 

Borates
Calcium compounds
Flame retardants